Borrowby is a village and civil parish in the Hambleton district of North Yorkshire, England.

Borrowby is one of the so-called Hillside Villages and can be found towards the eastern fringe of the vale where the land begins to rise to the moors. The village is said to be of Danish origin (ending –by) when it was some kind of stronghold. It was then mentioned in the 1086 Domesday Book and other early records under various spellings of "Berghby" meaning 'village on a hill'. This exposed location has always been good for growing orchards as the hill tops escaped the glacial debris and cannot be reached by the flood plains of the river, the Cod Beck. Borrowby was once part of the parish of Leake, which is further north, and in the first half of the 19th century there was an extensive manufacture of linen. Since 1978 the village has been a conservation area.

The village grew in a linear form along the main road sloping upwards to the north. It is characteristic, that to the front the buildings are separated by a broad grass verge to the main road and the backs of the properties are associated with the adjoining long plots that are accessed via a back lane. A triangular street formation divides High Borrowby from Low Borrowby and acts as a village green and centre with a public house, (The Wheatsheaf Inn), village hall and church. On the village green is an old cross which is said to have marked the border between Borrowby and the town of Gueldable, (and the two Wapentakes of Allerton and Birdforth) at a time when both townships were completely intermixed.

It is clear that the structure and character of the village have not significantly changed to this day, though some original cottages have been replaced by more modern versions and gaps between the buildings have been filled. There used to be a Primitive Methodist Chapel but today only the Methodist Church remains. On many of the old buildings traces of lime wash that coated the sandstone facades are still visible.

References

Further reading
Grainge, William (1859); The Vale of Mowbray: A Historical and Topographical Account of Thirsk and Its Neighbourhood; G. H. Smith & Son, reprint 1993.  
Bogg, Edmund; The Golden Vale of Mowbray, Elliot Stock; reprint edition (1909)

External links

The Borrowby Show
Borrowby on the Thirsk website
Borrowby on the National Flood Forum

Villages in North Yorkshire
Civil parishes in North Yorkshire